The 2020 CONCACAF Women's U-20 Championship qualifying stage took place between 13–21 July 2019. The teams competed for four of the 20 berths in the 2020 CONCACAF Women's U-20 Championship final tournament.

Players born on or after 1 January 2000 are eligible to compete.

Teams
The qualifying format changed from the 2018 edition, and the teams were no longer divided into regional zones.

The 41 CONCACAF teams were ranked based on the CONCACAF Women’s Under-20 Ranking as of 2018. A total of 26 teams entered the tournament. The highest-ranked 16 entrants were exempt from qualifying and advanced directly to the group stage of the final tournament, while the lowest-ranked 10 entrants participated in the qualifying stage, where the two group winners and the two group runners-up advanced to the round of 16 of the knockout stage of the final tournament.

Notes

Draw
The draw for the qualifying stage took place on 19 April 2019, 11:00 EDT (UTC−4), at the CONCACAF Headquarters in Miami. The 10 teams which entered the qualifying stage were drawn into two groups of five teams. Based on the CONCACAF Women's Under-20 Ranking, the 10 teams were distributed into five pots, as follows:

Qualifying stage
The winners and runners-up of each group qualified for the final tournament, where they will enter the round of 16 of the knockout stage.

Tiebreakers
The ranking of teams in each group is determined as follows (Regulations Article 12.4):
Points obtained in all group matches (three points for a win, one for a draw, zero for a loss);
Goal difference in all group matches;
Number of goals scored in all group matches;
Points obtained in the matches played between the teams in question;
Goal difference in the matches played between the teams in question;
Number of goals scored in the matches played between the teams in question;
Fair play points in all group matches (only one deduction could be applied to a player in a single match):
Yellow card: −1 points;
Indirect red card (second yellow card): −3 points;
Direct red card: −4 points;
Yellow card and direct red card: −5 points;
Drawing of lots.

Group A
Matches were played at the Synthetic Track and Field Facility, Leonora in Guyana. All times are local, AST (UTC−4).

Group B
Matches were played at the Warner Park Sporting Complex, Basseterre in Saint Kitts and Nevis. All times are local, AST (UTC−4).

References

External links
Concacaf Women's Under-20 Championship, CONCACAF.com

Qualifying stage
Women's U-20 Championship qualifying stage
2019 in women's association football
2019 in youth association football
July 2019 sports events in North America